Amphientometae is an infraorder of psocids, one of two major division of the Troctomorpha within the order Psocodea (formerly Psocoptera). There are about 7 families and at least 230 described species in Amphientometae.

Families
These seven families belong to the infraorder Amphientometae:
 Amphientomidae Enderlein, 1903 (tropical barklice)
 Compsocidae Mockford, 1967
 Manicapsocidae Mockford, 1967
 Musapsocidae Mockford, 1967
 Protroctopsocidae Smithers, 1972
 Troctopsocidae Mockford, 1967
 † Electrentomidae Enderlein, 1911

References

Further reading

 

Troctomorpha